Sangara is a village in the Khyber Pakhtunkhwa Province of Pakistan. It is located at 34°1'20N 73°13'30E with an altitude of 1316 metres (4320 feet).

References

Villages in Khyber Pakhtunkhwa